The Hawaiian duck (Anas wyvilliana) or koloa is a species of bird in the family Anatidae that is endemic to the large islands of Hawaii. Taxonomically, the koloa is closely allied with the mallard (A. platyrhynchos). It differs in that it is monochromatic (with similarly marked males and females) and non-migratory. As with many duck species in the genus Anas, Hawaiian duck and mallards can interbreed and produce viable offspring, and the koloa has previously been considered an island subspecies of the mallard. However, all major authorities now consider this form to be a distinct species within the mallard complex. Recent analyses indicate that this is a distinct species that arose through ancient hybridization between mallard and Laysan duck (Anas laysanensis). The native Hawaiian name for this duck is koloa maoli (meaning "native duck"), or simply koloa. This species is listed as endangered by the IUCN Red List of Threatened Species, and its population trend is decreasing.

Physiology

Appearance
Both male and female are mottled brown in color and resemble a female mallard. The males are usually bigger than the females. The speculum feathers of both sexes are green to blue, bordered on both sides by white. The tail is dark overall, unlike the black-and-white tail of a mallard. The feet and legs are orange to yellow-orange. The bill is olive green in the male and dull orange with dark markings in the female. The adult male has a darker head and neck. The female is generally lighter-colored than the male and has plainer back feathers. A first-year male Hawaiian duck looks like an eclipse-plumaged male mallard. Seasonal plumage differences, individual variation, and variation between islands can make it difficult to differentiate between Hawaiian ducks, female mallards and hybrids of Hawaiian ducks and mallards. In addition, the extent of hybridization at a location can contribute to the difficulty of identification.

Body size
On average, the male weighs  and the female weighs . The Hawaiian duck is typically smaller than the mallard by 20 to 30 percent.

Diet
Hawaiian ducks are “opportunistic feeders.” Their diet consists of freshwater vegetation, mollusks, insects, and other aquatic invertebrates. Specifically, they are known to consume snails, insect larvae, earthworms, tadpoles, crayfish, mosquito larvae, mosquito fish, grass seeds, rice, and green algae.

Vocalization
The Hawaiian duck quacks like a mallard, but its call is softer and it quacks less frequently.

Behavior
The Hawaiian duck is a very wary bird, often found in pairs instead of large groups. The koloa is most prominently found residing in the tall, wetland grasses and streams near the Kohala volcano on the main island of Hawai’i (Reed et al. 2012). They are very secretive birds and do not associate with other animals much.

Reproduction
Some pairs nest year-round, but the primary breeding season is from December to May, during which pairs often engage in spectacular nuptial flights. The clutch size is usually eight. The female lays two to ten eggs in a well-concealed nest lined with down and breast feathers. Incubation lasts about four weeks. The young can take to the water soon after hatching, but cannot fly until about nine weeks of age. Offspring become sexually mature enough to reproduce after a year.

Female Hawaiian ducks have a strange attraction to male mallards (a more general species of ducks in the same area). It's unknown whether the female Hawaiian duck attracts the male mallard or whether the color variation of the male mallard attracts the female. In any case this interbreeding creates viable offspring.[7]  Evolution has not moved fast enough for this species to be unable to mate. This interbreeding is one of the main causes for the endangerment of the Hawaiian duck, specifically hybridization, which is explained below.[7]

Location and environment
The former range of the Hawaiian duck included all of the main Hawaiian islands except the islands of Lānaʻi and Kauaʻi. Hawaiian ducks were found on the hottest coasts with suitable ponds as well as in the mountains that were up to 7,000 feet high.(Perkins 1903, cited in Banko 1987b). This includes low wetlands, river valleys, and streams in mountains. “Genetically-pure Koloa populations were believed to occur on the islands of Kaua'i (Browne et al. 1993, Rhymer 2001), Ni'ihau, and highlands of Hawai'i with hybrid swarms on O'ahu and Maui (Engilis and Pratt 1993), but there is now evidence of hybridization within pure populations (Engilis et al. 2002).” The Hawaiian duck was extirpated on all other islands, but was subsequently reestablished on Oʻahu, Hawaiʻi, and Maui through release of captive-reared birds. However, all the Hawaiian ducks in the reestablished populations have bred with feral mallard ducks and have produced hybrid offspring that are fully fertile (Griffin et al. 1989); consequently, "pure" Hawaiian ducks are still only found on Kauaʻi. With an approximate population of 2,200 birds (Engiiis and Pratt 1993, Engilis et al. 2002) This consists of 2,000 on Kaua`i and 200 on Hawai`i. However, these ducks are in decline due to hybridization. They are also vulnerable to predators because of the low location of their nests on the ground. This makes it easier for predators such as cats, pigs, dogs, and mongoose to attack them. In addition to predators, Kauai has experienced a loss of lowland wetland habitat, in turn affecting the Hawaiian ducks.

Conservation status
Wildlife refuges including Hanalei National Wildlife Refuge on Kaua'i are essential breeding areas for Hawaiian Ducks (Todd 1996)  The species was reintroduced to O’ahu between 1958 and 1982. In 1989, twelve of these captured birds were released on the island of Maui. The species was also reestablished on the island of Hawai'i between 1976 and 1982 (U.S. Fish and Wildlife Service 2005). Throughout the 1980s, the importation of Mallards to Hawai'i was limited in an effort to reduce hybridization with Hawaiian Ducks. (Uyehara et al. 2007)  Other conservation efforts for the Hawaiian Duck include the development of “techniques for the identification of hybrids” (Uyehara et al. 2007), which in turn will result in, “simultaneous genetic testing and morphological characterisation” (U.S. Fish and Wildlife Service 2005).

Hybridization

Hybridization is arguably one of the most serious but overlooked threats to the Hawaiian duck, specifically interbreeding between Hawaiian ducks and feral mallards. Since hybridization has been happening for an extended period of time, it is unlikely any pure versions of these species are left.[3] “Determination of the population status of Hawaiian ducks and whether there are any pure Hawaiian ducks left on O`ahu will require simultaneous genetic testing and morphological characterization to develop reliable morphological criteria for distinguishing Hawaiian ducks, female mallards, and hybrids. Once such criteria are available they can be used to identify birds for removal in order to reduce interbreeding and introgression.”[3]

It has been shown that offspring between mallards and the Hawaiian duck produce fertile offspring. It has also been shown on Kauai that breeding Hawaiian duck/mallard crosses with Hawaiian ducks over time reduces the expression of the mallard genes showing promise to restoring the natural population. Efforts are underway to remove mallards from the islands in order to preserve the genetic diversity of the Hawaiian duck.

Other factors influencing population
The Hawaiian duck's population is affected by habitat loss, modifications to wetland habitats for flood control, non-native invasive plants, diseases, environmental contaminants, hunting and predation. The primary avian diseases of concern in Hawai’i are avian malaria and avian pox, which have devastated forest birds and greatly limited their distributions (Reed, et al. 2012). Predation threats to the koloa maoli include feral cats, rats, and small Asian mongooses, which eat the eggs and young.

Other ways that the Hawaiian ducks are being threatened is through the predation of dogs, introduced fish, and also other birds that are being introduced into their habitat. The previous hunting of water birds in these area from 1800s to the 1900s also played a major role in the decline of this species. Urban development along with loss of their natural habitat due to the use of the land for local agriculture plays a major role to the indefinite decline of this now endangered species (U.S. Fish and Wildlife Service 2005).  Amongst the threat of urban development certain problems arise such as human disturbance, whether it be recreation or through tourism. Through their constant migration from their ever-degrading habitat, another obstacle arises, that which is drought. In the late 1800s, the mallard, also known as Anas platyrhynchos, were flown in to stock up the ponds of Hawaii for ornamental purposes, but soon enough they were massively imported throughout the 1950s and the 1960s  (U.S. Fish and Wildlife Service 2005).

Interbreeding with feral mallards is the result, as the hybrids seem to be less well adapted to the local ecosystem. This interbreeding is rather common due to the high numbers of feral mallards. Several attempted reintroductions have already failed due to the hybrid ducks produced in captivity faring badly in the wild (Rhymer & Simberloff 1996). The "conversion of flooded taro fields to dry sugar-cane acreage" destroys parts of this species' habitat.[3]

Conservation actions
Throughout the cold winters a wild refuge is a very important factor for this species. The Hanalei National Wildlife Refuge makes this all possible for the Anas wyvilliana to procreate when their habitat is not suitable for their survival (Todd 1996). The species was then for the first time introduced into O’ahu where only a scarce amount of almost 326 captive birds of the species were released into the wilderness between the years of 1958 and 1982. Later on in 1989 only twelve of these captured birds were released into the island of maui. Due to these efforts to conserve and procreate, the species was finally reestablished on the “Big Island” between 1976 and 1982 (U.S. Fish and Wildlife Service 2005). Throughout the later years in the 1980s, “the importation of A. platyrhynchos was restricted by the state, with exceptions only for research and exhibition” (Uyehara et al. 2007). Other efforts have or are being done to further progress the conservation of the Anas wyvilliana such as development of, “techniques for the identification of hybrids ” (Uyehara et al. 2007). Which in turn will result in, “simultaneous genetic testing and morphological characterisation” (U.S. Fish and Wildlife Service 2005).

Endangerment recovery
Many plans for this species' survival has been set, but there is still much more information required in order to obtain maximum results. More information is still required for distinguishing hybrids (visually is too difficult, requires genetic screening), conserving habitat, examining migratory patterns and measuring the extent different wetlands effect the Hawaiian duck.  It is an ongoing issue that requires constant attention, the more accurate the research is, the better of an idea we have of where money should be spent to help the Hawaiian duck survive. With that said, the Hawaiian Bird Conservation Action Plan has come up with a five-year plan to hopefully negate some of the species' main threats such as hybridization, habitat restoration/management and predator control.  They want to,"Manage hybridization on all islands by removing feral Mallards and hybrids to the maximum extent practicable." "Obtain public acceptance of feral duck control", "Continue protection and restoration of important wetland habitats", "Develop alternative predator control methods and explore the use of predator fences." It's estimated this plan will cost close to five million dollars.

References
 U.S. Fish and Wildlife Service. 2011. Recovery Plan for Hawaiian Waterbirds, Second Revision. U.S. Fish and Wildlife Service, Portland, Oregon. xx + 233 pp. http://www.fws.gov/pacificislands/CH_Rules/Hawaiian%20Waterbirds%20RP%202nd%20Revision.pdf 
 J. Michael, Reed, et al. "Long-Term Persistence of Hawaii’s Endangered Avifauna through Conservation-Reliant Management." BioScience 2012: 881. JSTOR Journals. Web
 Uyehara, Kimberly J., Engilis, Andrew, Jr., and Reynolds, Michelle, 2007, Hawaiian Duck's future threatened by feral mallards: U.S. Geological Survey Fact Sheet 2007-3047 http://pubs.usgs.gov/fs/2007/3047/
 “Endangered Species in the Pacific Islands.” Pacific Islands Fish and Wildlife Office. U.S. Fish and Wildlife Service, 20 Sep. 2012. Web. 22 Oct. 2014. http://www.fws.gov/pacificislands/fauna/HIduck.html
 BirdLife International (2014) Species factsheet: Anas wyvilliana. Retrieved from http://www.birdlife.org on 22/10/2014. http://www.birdlife.org/datazone/speciesfactsheet.php?id=436
 http://eol.org/pages/1048962/details#reproduction 
 Uyehara, Kimberly J., Andrew Engilis Jr., and Bruce D. Dugger. "Wetland Features That Influence Occupancy By The Endangered Hawaiian Duck." Wilson Journal of Ornithology 120.2 (2008): 311–319. Academic Search Premier. Web. 23 Oct. 2014.
 Endangered Hawaiian Duck | The Molokai Dispatch. (2008, January 13). Retrieved October 23, 2014, from themolokaidispatch 
 Hawaiian Duck. (2011, November 9). Retrieved October 23, 2014, from http://www.planetofbirds.com/anseriformes-anatidae-hawaiian-duck-anas-wyvilliana 
 U.S. Fish and Wildlife Service (2005) Draft revised recovery plan for Hawaiian waterbirds, 2nd draft of the 2nd revision. U.S. Fish and Wildlife Service, Portland, Oregon. p 155
 
 Todd, F. S. 1996. Natural history of the waterfowl. Ibis Publishing Company, Vista, CA, U.S.A.
 BROWNE, R. A., C. R. GRIM IN. P R. CHANC;. M. HUBLEY, AND A. E. MARTIN. 1993. Genetic divergence among populations of the Hawaiian Duck. Laysan Duck, and Mallard. Auk 110:49-^6.
 ENGILIS JR.. A. AND T. K. PRATT. 1993. Status and population trends of Hawaii's native waterbirds. 1977–1987. Wilson Bulleiin 105:142-158
 ENGILIS JR.. A.. K. J. UYI:HARA, AND J. G. GIFUN. 2002. Hawaiian Duck [Anas wyvitlianu). The birds of North America. Nuiiiber 694.
 RHYMER, J. M. 2001. Evolutionary relationships and conservation of the Hawaiian anatids. Studies in Avian Biology 22:61—67

Griffin, C. R.; Shallenberger, F. J. & Fefer, S. I. (1989): Hawaii's endangered waterbirds: a resource management challenge. In: Sharitz, R. R. & Gibbons, I. W. (eds.): Proceedings of Freshwater Wetlands and Wildlife Symposium: 155–169. Savannah River Ecology Lab, Aiken, South Carolina.
 Hawaii Audubon Society (2005): Hawaii's Birds (6th edition). 
Rhymer, Judith M. & Simberloff, Daniel (1996): Extinction by hybridization and introgression. Annu. Rev. Ecol. Syst. 27: 83-109.  (HTML abstract)

 [3] "Recovery Plan For Hawaiian Waterbirds Second Revision" (Anas Laysanensis)." (2009): ArchiveGrid. Web. 23 Oct. 2014.
 
[6] Plan, Hawaiian Bird Conservation Action. Focal Species: Hawaiian Duck or Koloa Maoli (Anas Wyvilliana) (n.d.): n. pag. Web.
[7] Draft Revised Recovery Plan for Hawaiian Waterbirds. Portland, Or.: U.S. Fish and Wildlife Service, 2005. Web.

Notes

External links

BirdLife Species Factsheet

 

 

Ducks
Anas
Endemic birds of Hawaii
Biota of Hawaii (island)
Biota of Maui
Biota of Oahu
Endangered fauna of Hawaii
Birds described in 1878
Taxa named by Philip Sclater
ESA endangered species